Elections to South Yorkshire County Council, a metropolitan county council in the north east of England, were held on 7 May 1981, resulting in a council with Labour members forming a majority.

This was the last election to the South Yorkshire county council, as metropolitan county councils were abolished in 1986.

Results

References

1981 English local elections
1980s in South Yorkshire
1981